Down in Flames may refer to:

"Down in Flames" (Blackhawk song), a 1994 song by Blackhawk
"Down in Flames", a song by AJ Mitchell
"Down in Flames" (Semisonic song), a 1996 song by Semisonic
"Down in Flames", a song from Zebrahead's 2006 album Broadcast to the World
"Down in Flames", a song from Relient K's 2001 album The Anatomy of the Tongue in Cheek
Down in Flames, a card game published by GMT Games and Dan Verssen Games
Down in Flames (video game), a 2005 computer video game published by Battlefront.com, based on the aftermentioned card game
Down in Flames: Eastern Front, a 2006 expansion pack of the video game